"Pumpy" is a song by Da Beatfreakz featuring Cadet, AJ & Deno and Swarmz. It was released on 26 October 2018 and peaked at number 70 on the UK Singles Chart.

Charts

References

2018 songs
2018 singles
Cadet (rapper) songs
Deno (singer) songs
Sony Music UK singles